Julius Napoleon Wilhelm Harteveld (5 April 1859 – 1 October 1927) was a Swedish composer and musicologist.  He was born and died in Stockholm.

Swedish composers
Swedish male composers
1859 births
1927 deaths